Imran Ashraf Awan (born 11 September 1989) is a Pakistani actor and writer. Ashraf appeared in Dil Lagi, Alif Allah Aur Insaan and Raqs-e-Bismil. He is best known for portraying mentally challenged Bhola in Ranjha Ranjha Kardi for which he won the Best TV Actor at the Lux Style Awards.

Personal life 
Imran Ashraf was born on 11 September 1989 in Peshawar. 

In 2018, he married Kiran Imran. The couple has a son Roham Ashraf.

Career 

Further, in 2017, he appeared as a transgender in Alif Allah Aur Insaan and won an award at the 6th Hum Awards. In 2018, he wrote the drama serial Tabeer and was nominated for Best Writer at the 7th Hum Awards.

In 2020 he worked in Mushk which is written by Imran himself. He played the protagonist alongside Urwa Hocane and Momal Sheikh.

Television

Films

Awards and nominations

References

External links
 
 magtheweekly interview
 viewers-choice-award-2016
 

1989 births
Living people
Pakistani male television actors
Pakistani male film actors
People from Sialkot District
Punjabi people